Ingrid Persohn (born 20 March 1952) is a German former professional racing cyclist. She won the German National Road Race Championship in 1970, 1971 and 1975.

References

External links
 

1952 births
Living people
German female cyclists
People from Germersheim (district)
Cyclists from Rhineland-Palatinate